Ian Dalrymple (26 August 190328 March 1989) was a British screenwriter, film director, film editor and film producer.

Biography 
Born in Johannesburg, South Africa, he was educated at Rugby and Trinity College, Cambridge. He worked in advertising then went into the film industry.

Editor
Initially, he worked as an editor at Gainsborough Pictures working his way up to head editor. He then went to become head editor at Gaumont-British pictures from Rome Express onwards.

Screenwriter
He went into screenwriting with great success. He was nominated for an Oscar for his contribution to the script of Pygmalion.

Dalrymple went to work on Alexander Korda's propaganda film The Lion Has Wings (1939). One of its directors, Michael Powell, called Dalrymple "an extremely able and very nice man and a wonderful organiser."

Crown Film Unit
During World War II, from 1940-43 he was a producer for the Crown Film Unit, the government run agency for information and propaganda films, in particular working, and forming a close friendship, with Humphrey Jennings.

Dalrymple said in 1941 their goal was:
We say in film to our own people 'This is what the boys in the services, or the girls in the factories, or the men and women in Civil Defence, or the patient citizens themselves are like, and what they are doing. They are playing their part in the spirit in which you see them in this film. Be of good heart and go and do likewise'. And we say to the world, 'Here in these films are the British people at war' ... It has seen the truth and it can make up its own mind.

Korda
In 1943 Dalrymple went to work for Alex Korda as production supervisor.

Wessex
In 1946 Dalrymple formed his own production company, Wessex Productions, based at Pinewood Studios. Among his employees were Pat Jackson and Jack Lee, who worked with him at the Crown Film Unit. The company signed an agreement with Rank, and made The Woman in the Hall (1947), written and produced by Dalrymple and directed by Lee. It was followed by Esther Waters (1948), which Dalrymple directed alongside Peter Proud, and is remembered today for introducing Dirk Bogarde. Bogarde starred in two other Wessex films, Once a Jolly Swagman (1949), directed by Lee, and Dear Mr. Prohack (1949) directed by Thornton Freeland. They also made All Over the Town (1949), directed by Derek Twist.

None of the films had been particularly successful at the box office. In 1949 Wessex moved from Rank to Korda's London Films, who distributed through British Lion Films. The change had instant results: Wessex's first film in association with London, The Wooden Horse (1950), directed by Lee, was a big hit. It also made a star of Anthony Steel.

Dalrymple returned to documentary filmmaking with Jennings with Family Portrait (1950) and The Changing Face of Europe (1951) but Jennings then died in an accident. He had a critical success with The Heart of the Matter (1953) starring Trevor Howard. It was followed by Three Cases of Murder (1955), a horror anthology, and Raising a Riot (1955), a Kenneth More comedy directed by Wendy Toye which was a big success.

Wessex made a film about the Korean War, A Hill in Korea (1956), best remembered today for giving early roles to actors such as Robert Shaw, Stanley Baker and Michael Caine.

In the late 1960s he was film adviser to Decca and supervisor of film projects at Argo.

He died in London on 28 March 1989.

Selected filmography

Sources 
 Halliwell's Who's Who in the Movies – published by Harper-Collins 
 Chronicle of the Cinema published by D & K –

References

External links

1903 births
1989 deaths
People from Johannesburg
British film directors
British film producers
British film editors
British male screenwriters
Best Adapted Screenplay Academy Award winners
Alumni of Trinity College, Cambridge
20th-century British screenwriters